Anna Katerina Baryshnikov (born May 22, 1992) is an American actress. She had her breakout role as Sandy in the 2016 film Manchester by the Sea and was a series regular in the CBS sitcom Superior Donuts first season. From 2019 to 2021, she played Lavinia Norcross Dickinson on the Apple TV+ series Dickinson.

Early life 
Baryshnikov is the daughter of Russian-American ballet dancer and actor Mikhail Baryshnikov and former ballet dancer Lisa Rinehart. As a young girl, she took beginner's ballet classes but decided she was unsuited to it, as she was too hyperactive and talkative when she was supposed to be focused at the barre. Her elder half-sister, from her father's relationship with actress Jessica Lange, is dancer Shura Baryshnikov. Anna grew up in Palisades, New York, and attended the Ethical Culture Fieldston School in New York City.

Career 
Baryshnikov began acting at age 6 in a children's theater production of A Midsummer Night's Dream, portraying Peaseblossom, a handmaiden to fairy queen Titania. After graduating from Northwestern University in 2014, she began acting professionally on various television series, including Doll & Em on HBO. Her parents were initially hesitant about her career choice before becoming supportive.

Baryshnikov's most prominent role to date was in the 2016 critically acclaimed drama Manchester by the Sea, alongside Casey Affleck and Michelle Williams. Her character, Sandy, is a girlfriend of Patrick Chandler, portrayed by Lucas Hedges. She practiced her character's Boston accent by working with a dialect coach and going to Boston-area malls to hear how local teenage girls spoke.

Baryshnikov starred as grad student Maya in the CBS series Superior Donuts, based on the play of the same name by Tracy Letts. The series, which debuted in February 2017, was renewed for a second season by CBS, but Baryshnikov's character does not appear in the second season. In 2017, she appeared in the Broadway production of the play Time and the Conways. In 2018, she appeared in the film The Kindergarten Teacher.

On September 26, 2018, Baryshnikov was cast in the role of Lavinia Norcross Dickinson in the Apple TV+ series Dickinson, alongside Hailee Steinfeld.

Filmography

References

External links 
 
 

1992 births
Living people
American people of Russian descent
Anna
21st-century American actresses
Northwestern University alumni
American television actresses
People from Palisades, New York
American film actresses
Place of birth missing (living people)
Actresses from New York (state)